Jorge Arripe (born 21 January 1936) is an Argentine rower. He competed in the men's coxed four event at the 1952 Summer Olympics.

References

External links
 

1936 births
Living people
Argentine male rowers
Olympic rowers of Argentina
Rowers at the 1952 Summer Olympics
Place of birth missing (living people)